South Russell is a village in Geauga County, Ohio, United States. The population was 3,972 at the 2020 census.

History
South Russell was incorporated in 1923, as of 2015 the last village in Geauga County to have done so.

Geography
South Russell is located at  (41.432175, -81.340201).

Demographics

98.07% of the population speaks English as their primary language, and 1.93% speak French.

2010 census
As of the census of 2010, there were 3,819 people, 1,373 households, and 1,121 families living in the village. The racial makeup of the village was 97.5% White, 0.4% African American, 0.1% Native American, 1.2% Asian, 0.1% Pacific Islander, 0.1% from other races, and 0.7% from two or more races. Hispanic or Latino of any race were 0.8% of the population.

There were 1,373 households, of which 41.2% had children under the age of 18 living with them, 73.5% were married couples living together, 5.4% had a female householder with no husband present, 2.8% had a male householder with no wife present, and 18.4% were non-families. 16.5% of all households were made up of individuals, and 7.7% had someone living alone who was 65 years of age or older. The average household size was 2.77 and the average family size was 3.13.

The median age in the village was 44.9 years. 29.1% of residents were under the age of 18; 4.8% were between the ages of 18 and 24; 16.4% were from 25 to 44; 35.7% were from 45 to 64; and 14.1% were 65 years of age or older. The gender makeup of the village was 49.7% male and 50.3% female.

2000 census
As of the census of 2000, there were 4,022 people, 1,364 households, and 1,159 families living in the village. The population density was 1,043.6 people per square mile (403.4/km). There were 1,401 housing units at an average density of 363.5 per square mile (140.5/km). The racial makeup of the village was 98.43% White, 0.35% African American, 0.80% Asian, and 0.42% from two or more races. Hispanic or Latino of any race were 0.72% of the population.

There were 1,364 households, out of which 47.0% had children under the age of 18 living with them, 77.6% were married couples living together, 5.1% had a female householder with no husband present, and 15.0% were non-families. 13.4% of all households were made up of individuals, and 6.6% had someone living alone who was 65 years of age or older. The average household size was 2.95 and the average family size was 3.26.

In the village, the population was spread out, with 32.8% under the age of 18, 3.8% from 18 to 24, 23.7% from 25 to 44, 28.8% from 45 to 64, and 10.9% who were 65 years of age or older. The median age was 40 years. For every 100 females there were 96.3 males. For every 100 females age 18 and over, there were 91.3 males.

The median income for a household in the village was $94,714, and the median income for a family was $103,174. Males had a median income of $84,783 versus $38,854 for females. The per capita income for the village was $41,091. None of the families and 0.6% of the population were living below the poverty line, including no under eighteens and none of those over 64.

Education
South Russell is served by the Chagrin Falls Exempted Village School District.

References

External links
 Village website
 County website

Villages in Geauga County, Ohio
Cleveland metropolitan area
Villages in Ohio